Arcuate (Latin for "curved") can refer to:

Anatomy
 Arcuate fasciculus
 Arcuate line (disambiguation)
 Arcuate artery (disambiguation), several arteries
 Arcuate nucleus
 Arcuate nucleus (medulla)
 Arcuate ligaments of the diaphragm
 Arcuate vein
 Arcuate vessels of uterus
 Internal arcuate fibers of the brain

Other
 Arcuate architecture, employing its arches and beams
 Arcuate delta, a type of river delta
 Arcuate pocket a type of pocket used in clothing, especially jeans made by Levi Strauss
 Arcuate rack, a curved rack gear